The Yura River is a river of Bolivia in the Potosí Department, Antonio Quijarro Province. Its waters flow to the Pillku Mayu while the river successively receives the names Toropalca, Tumusla, Camblaya and Pilaya. Pilaya River is a right tributary of Pillku Mayu.

See also
List of rivers of Bolivia

References

Rand McNally, The New International Atlas, 1993.

Rivers of Potosí Department